Francisco Cerúndolo was the defending champion but lost in the second round to Gonçalo Oliveira.

Alejandro Tabilo won the title after defeating Jesper de Jong 6–1, 7–5 in the final.

Seeds

Draw

Finals

Top half

Bottom half

References

External links
Main draw
Qualifying draw

Challenger Ciudad de Guayaquil - 1
2021 Singles